The 2004 Little League World Series took place between August 20 and August 29 in South Williamsport, Pennsylvania. The Pabao Little League of Willemstad, Curaçao, defeated Conejo Valley Little League of Thousand Oaks, California, in the championship game of the 58th Little League World Series. This was the first LLWS title for the Caribbean island of Curaçao.

Qualification

Pool play
The top two teams in each pool move on to their respective semifinals. The winners of each will meet August 29 to play for the Little League world championship.

August 20

August 21

August 22

August 23

August 24

International

August 20

August 21

August 22

August 23

August 24

Elimination rounds

Notable players
Jurickson Profar (Willemstad, Curacao)  San Diego Padres infielder
Jonathan Schoop (Willemstad, Curacao)  Detroit Tigers infielder
Randal Grichuk (Richmond, Texas)   Toronto Blue Jays Outfielder
Christian Bethancourt (Panama City, Panama) San Diego Padres Catcher
Wei-Chung Wang (Kaohsiung, Taiwan) Oakland Athletics pitcher
Michael Conforto (Redmond, Washington) New York Mets Outfielder

Champions path

Notes
† Postponed (rained out)
‡ Game ended by "mercy rule" (at least 10-run difference through 4 innings)

External links
2004 official results via Wayback Machine
Recap of championship game via Wayback Machine

 
Little League World Series
Little League World Series
Little League World Series